Tureň is a village and municipality in western Slovakia in  Senec District in the Bratislava Region.

Geography

History
In historical records the village was first mentioned in 1252.
After the Austro-Hungarian army disintegrated in November 1918, Czechoslovak troops occupied the area, later acknowledged internationally by the Treaty of Trianon. Between 1938 and 1945 Tureň once more  became part of Miklós Horthy's Hungary through the First Vienna Award. From 1945 until the Velvet Divorce, it was part of Czechoslovakia. Since then it has been part of Slovakia.

Population
It has a population of about 878 people.

References

External links/Sources
 http://turen.sk/
http://www.statistics.sk/mosmis/eng/run.html

Villages and municipalities in Senec District